Rhyme Pays is the debut studio album by American rapper Ice-T, released on July 28, 1987, by Sire Records. The album peaked at number 93 on the US Billboard 200 and number 23 on the Top R&B/Hip-Hop Albums charts, and was certified gold by the Recording Industry Association of America (RIAA).

Music and lyrics 
The album, especially tracks like "6 'N the Morning", is considered to have defined the gangsta rap genre. Ice-T claims that this would be his first hip hop album to be carrying a parental advisory warning label, although, it was years before the industry-standard explicit-lyrics sticker was developed and Too $hort's first album that also had to be carried with an "Explicit Lyrics" warning back in 1985. The 1988 CD release included four bonus tracks.

Ice-T stated on his autobiography that Seymour Stein took the exception to the song "409" for the line "Guys grab a girl, girls grab a guy/If a guy wants a guy, please take it outside", which he saw as homophobic. Ice-T insisted that those lines were not meant to be homophobic, but simply a statement of his own preferences.

Critical reception 
Rolling Stone gave the album three stars. In a contemporary review for The Village Voice, Robert Christgau gave Rhyme Pays a "B" and credited DJ Afrika Islam for helping flesh out Ice T's crime-themed raps: "Can't know whether his streetwise jabs at Reagan and recidivism will make a permanent impression on his core audience, but his sexploitations and true crime tales are detailed and harrowing enough to convince anybody he was there." According to AllMusic's Alex Henderson, who later gave the record three-and-a-half out of five stars, "the West Coast was well on its way to becomining a crucial part of hip-hop" when Rhyme Pays was released. Los Angeles Times writer Dennis Hunt said the album helped popularize gangsta rap.

Commercial performance 
Rhyme Pays debuted at number 93 on the US Billboard 200 and number 26 on the Billboard Top R&B/Hip Hop Albums charts. It also became the first hip-hop album to be released on Sire and Warner Bros. Records. The album was eventually certified gold by the Recording Industry Association of America (RIAA) for sales of over 500,000 copies in the United States.

Track listing

Charts

Weekly charts

Certifications

References 

1987 debut albums
Ice-T albums
Sire Records albums
Albums produced by Afrika Islam